Cavalry Charge is a 1964 Spanish adventure western film directed by Ramón Torrado, written by Bautista Lacasa Nebot, scored by Daniel White and starring Alan Scott, Frank Latimore and Diana Lorys. It place an emphasise on the Francoist patria.

Cast

References

External links
 

Spanish Western (genre) films
1964 adventure films
1964 Western (genre) films
1964 films
Films directed by Ramón Torrado